Thomas Henry Morison (August 24, 1838 – February 10, 1884) was Warden of the Borough of Norwalk, Connecticut from 1878 to 1880.

He was born on August 24, 1838, in Brooklyn, New York, the son of Thomas Ames Morison and Amy H. Hoyt.

In 1853, he went to work in his father's clothing store, and in 1858, he was made a partner. Eventually, he became the senior member of the firm of Morison & Hutchinson. In 1867, he came to Norwalk to take over the factory operations of the firm.

Morison also engaged in the gas business, banking, railroads, and fire insurance.
He was elected a water commissioner.

References 

1838 births
1884 deaths
Connecticut Democrats
Mayors of Norwalk, Connecticut
People from Brooklyn
Clothing manufacturers
19th-century American politicians